In mathematics, the Hermite–Hadamard inequality, named after Charles Hermite and Jacques Hadamard and sometimes also called Hadamard's inequality, states that if a function ƒ : [a, b] → R is convex, then the following chain of inequalities hold:

 

 

where  is a constant depending only on the dimension.

A corollary on Vandermonde-type integrals 

Let  be convex, and let  denote the "integral starting at " operator; that is, 
.

Then

 

Equality holds for all  iff  is linear, and for all  iff  is constant, in the sense that 
 

References

 Jacques Hadamard, "Étude sur les propriétés des fonctions entières et en particulier d'une fonction considérée par Riemann", Journal de Mathématiques Pures et Appliquées, volume 58, 1893, pages 171–215.
 Zoltán Retkes, "An extension of the Hermite–Hadamard Inequality", Acta Sci. Math. (Szeged), 74 (2008), pages 95–106.
 Mihály Bessenyei, "The Hermite–Hadamard Inequality on Simplices", American Mathematical Monthly, volume 115, April 2008, pages 339–345.
 Flavia-Corina Mitroi, Eleutherius Symeonidis, "The converse of the Hermite-Hadamard inequality on simplices", Expo. Math. 30 (2012), pp. 389–396. ; 
 Stefan Steinerberger, The Hermite-Hadamard Inequality in Higher Dimensions, The Journal of Geometric Analysis, 2019.

Inequalities
Theorems involving convexity